Mahavir Harina Vanasthali National Park is a deer national park located in Vanasthalipuram , Saheb Nagar, Hyderabad, Telangana, India. It is spread over 3605 acres. It is the largest green lung space in the city of Hyderabad.

History
The park was named after Mahavir, the 24th Tirthankara of Jainism, in commemoration of his 2500th nirvan anniversary in the year 1975. The place where the park is located was once a private hunting ground for the Nizam, rulers of Hyderabad. A deer park was set up in order to preserve this precious heritage and rehabilitate it.

The Park
Animals living in this national park include a few hundred blackbucks (the state animal of Andhra Pradesh), chitals, porcupines, water monitors, short-toed eagles, Indian pond herons, egrets, kingfishers, cormorants and several other bird species.

Ecotourism
Mahavira Harina Vanasthali is located in the outskirts of Hyderabad, on Hyderabad - Vijayawada road. It is easily approachable from the city. The park is maintained by the TS Forest Department. Guided tours are available within the park.

There is an entry fee for people who wish to enter the park by safari vehicle to view the animals. The entry fee details are available at the park web portal

Flora
 Dry deciduous forest mixed with scrub jungle and grasslands
 Sandalwood, rosewood, palas, amalthas, albizzias, acacias, teak
 The terrain varies from hilly to gently rolling.

Fauna
 Panther, black buck, cheetal deer, wild boar, civet, porcupine, peacock
 There are 30 species of reptiles and over 120 species of birds.

See also

 Mrugavani National Park
 Jawahar Deer Park
Kasu Brahmananda Reddy National Park

References

External links

 Official site

Geography of Hyderabad, India
Parks in Hyderabad, India
National parks in Telangana
Protected areas established in 1975
Tourist attractions in Hyderabad, India
1975 establishments in Andhra Pradesh